The Boston Patriot was a semiweekly newspaper based in Boston, Massachusetts. It was founded in 1809 to promote the interests of the Democratic-Republican Party. Between 1809 and 1812, it published a series of autobiographical letters by John Adams.

References

Newspapers published in Boston
Defunct newspapers published in Massachusetts
Publications established in 1809